Cadmus is an unincorporated community in Linn County, Kansas, United States.

History
A post office was opened in Cadmus in 1877, and remained in operation until it was discontinued in 1902.

Education
The community is served by Prairie View USD 362 public school district.

References

Further reading

External links
 Linn County maps: Current, Historic, KDOT

Unincorporated communities in Linn County, Kansas
Unincorporated communities in Kansas